Dr. Rebwar Fatah is a contemporary Kurdish writer and journalist. He runs the Kurdish news and commentary web site KurdishMedia.com. He is one of the influential Kurdish advocates in the Diaspora. His ideas and proposals have been influential in the understanding of the Middle East, in particular Kurdistan, Iraq, Iran, Syria and Turkey and equally important in influencing the West’s foreign policy on the Middle East.

Life
Dr Rebwar Fatah moved to live in exile in London in 1982. He has extensively contributed to the understanding of the Middle Eastern issues, including West’s foreign policy. He has written numerous articles, given talks and interviews, in both Kurdish and English, on the socio-political situation of the Middle East. He works as a Middle Eastern specialist.

His first article in Kurdish in a national Iraqi paper (Hawkari) appeared in 1972 and in the last several years he has produced and edited hundred of news items and articles for publications on daily basis.

He holds BSc, MSc and PhD degrees from London and University College London (UCL) respectively in Physics, Solid State Physics and in optical transmissions for sensing applications. He worked in executive and commercial positions for reputable British and international cooperatives and institutions for over 20 years. He worked for University of London and University College London (1983–1989); British Telecom (1989–97); Fujitsu (1997–2000); Nortel Networks (2000–01); 186k (2001–02). He has published over 100 papers as part of his professional work and given talks in numerous conferences and seminars.

He was born in Sulaimaniya city in Iraqi Kurdistan.

Positions
Author of ‘Souls of the Street: The Art of Photography and Street Photography, https://www.amazon.com/dp/B0848V5QH7/ref=nav_timeline_asin?_encoding=UTF8&psc=1
Author of ‘Hawkar: Newsletter of Hawkarani Kurdistan’, https://www.amazon.com/gp/product/B07NWRQQX1/ref=dbs_a_def_rwt_bibl_vppi_i0
Author of ‘My poetry depicts you: An anthology of contemporary Kurdish poetry’, https://www.amazon.co.uk/poetry-depicts-you-anthology-contemporary-ebook/dp/B01N9NRNQ5/ref=sr_1_1?ie=UTF8&qid=1483465607&sr=8-1&keywords=rebwar+fatah
Author of ‘Beauty of the Soul: Abstract Camera Images’, https://www.amazon.co.uk/Beauty-Soul-Abstract-Camera-Images/dp/B08NZHZGT3/ref=tmm_pap_swatch_0?_encoding=UTF8&qid=&sr=
Author of ‘Departing, poetry collection of Goran Meriwani’, https://www.amazon.co.uk/Departing-Poetry-Dr-Rebwar-Fatah/dp/B09C1NTV1T/ref=tmm_pap_swatch_0?_encoding=UTF8&qid=1629041357&sr=1-1 
Foundering member and the director of KurdishMedia.com, 1998-2012
Regular contributor to the Australian SBS Kurdish Radio, Sydney, 2000-2010
Contributing writer to Soma Diget, February 2006 - 2007
Regular contributor to the BBC London Live radio, 2001–02
Columnist in a cultural Australian-Kurdish weekly newspaper, Chira (The Lamp), 1998
Founding member and media coordinator of a Kurdish language Internet site Kurdish Language Technology Initiative (Kurd_lal) 1996-2000
Founding member and Editor-in-chief of an English newsletter Hawkar, London, 1992–1994
Foundering member, columnist and Editor-in-chief of the cultural Kurdish newsletter, Jîni Niwê (New life), London, 1990s
Member of the Executive Committee of the British Refugee Council for 3 years in the 1990s

References

External links
 Kurdish Institute of Paris, By Professor Michael M. Gunter, The Changing Dynamics in the Kurdistan Regional Government (KRG) of Iraq, 6-9 September 2006
 Self-excitation in fibre-optic microresonator sensors, By N.A.D.StokesR.M.A.FatahS.Venkatesh, Sensors and Actuators A: Volume 21, Issues 1–3, February 1990, Pages 369-372
 By Dr Rebwar Fatah, Mechanisms of optical activation of micromechanical resonators, Sensors and Actuators A: Physical, Volume 33, Issue 3, June 1992, Pages 229-236
 [KNN, an interview with Dr Rebwar Fatah, Kurdisan, 11 April 2011]
 Published books by Dr Rebwar Fatah: https://www.amazon.co.uk/Rebwar-Fatah/e/B01MR2BRWF?ref_=dbs_p_pbk_r00_abau_000000

Living people
People from Sulaymaniyah
Alumni of the University of London
Alumni of University College London
Kurdish-language writers
Kurdish journalists
British Telecom people
Fujitsu people
Nortel employees
Year of birth missing (living people)